The Grammy Award for Best Latin Pop Album is an award presented at the Grammy Awards, a ceremony that was established in 1958 and originally called the Gramophone Awards, to recording artists for releasing albums in the Latin pop genre. Honors in several categories are presented at the ceremony annually by the National Academy of Recording Arts and Sciences of the United States to "honor artistic achievement, technical proficiency and overall excellence in the recording industry, without regard to album sales or chart position".

Throughout its history, this award has had minor name changes: "Best Latin Pop Performance" (1984—1991, 1995–2000), "Best Latin Pop or Urban Album" (1992—1994, 2021) and "Best Latin Pop Album" since 2022. In 2012 the award was not presented due to a major overhaul of Grammy categories. That year recordings in this category were shifted to the newly formed "Best Latin Pop, Rock or Urban Album". However, later that year, the Board of Trustees announced that it would be bringing back the category for the 55th Grammy Awards in 2013 with the following description: "for albums containing at least 51 percent playing time of new vocal or instrumental Latin pop recordings". In June 2020, the Recording Academy decided to move the Latin urban genre from the Best Latin Rock, Alternative or Urban Album category to this category, as "the Latin urban genre, both aesthetically and musically, is much more closely related to the current state of Latin pop." However, from 2022, Latin urban music has been honored with its own separate category: Best Música Urbana Album.

From 1984 to 1991, the category allowed single tracks or albums, and as of 1992 only includes albums. Beginning in 1998, members of the Latin Academy of Recording Arts & Sciences (LARAS) are eligible to vote in the Latin field of the Grammy Award categories. Puerto Rican singer José Feliciano was the first awarded in the category for his album Me Enamoré (1984). Feliciano and Spanish singer Alejandro Sanz are the biggest winners with four accolades each. The most nominated performer is Mexican singer Luis Miguel with twelve nominations that resulted in three wins, including his consecutive awards for Aries (1994) and Segundo Romance (1995). In 1998, Spanish artists Enrique Iglesias and Julio Iglesias, father and son, where nominated against each other for their albums Vivir and Tango, respectively, losing both to Miguel's Romances. Guatemalan singer-songwriter Ricardo Arjona and Mexican musician Julieta Venegas tied in 2007 for their albums Adentro and Limón y Sal, respectively.

Panamanian artist Rubén Blades has received the award three times, in 2000, 2015 and 2023, and also has been recognized in other fields, with winning albums for Tropical Latin Album and World Music Album. Laura Pausini became the first Italian female artist to win a Grammy Award with the album Escucha in 2006. No Es lo Mismo by Sanz, La Vida... Es un Ratico and MTV Unplugged by Colombian artist Juanes, and Vida by Puerto Rican singer-songwriter Draco Rosa won the Grammy Award for Best Latin Pop Album and also received the Latin Grammy Award for Album of the Year. Shakira became the first female performer to receive the honor twice, with her winning albums MTV Unplugged (2001) and El Dorado (2018). As of 2020, Mexican singer José José is the most nominated performer without a win with six unsuccessful nominations.

Winners and nominees

Notes:
 Each year is linked to the article about the Grammy Awards held that year.
 Award was merged with the Best Latin Rock, Urban or Alternative Album into the newly created Grammy Award for Best Latin Pop, Rock or Urban Album.
Also awarded:
A: Adam Blackburn, Eric Schilling, Marcelo Añez and Sebastián Krys, engineers; Tim Mitchell, producer.
B: Joe Reyes, Michael Morales and Ronald Morales, engineers and producers.
C: Bob St. John, Eric Schilling, Gonzalo Vasquez, Gustavo Afont, Iker Gastraminsa, Jaime Lagueruela and Jon Fausty, engineers/mixers; Gonzalo Vasquez and Luis Fernando Ochoa, producers.
D: Pepo Sherman and Rafa Sardina, engineers; Mick Guzauski, engineer/mixer; Lulo Pérez, producer.
E: Gustavo "Pichon" Dal Pont and Sebastián Krys, engineers/mixers; Estéfano, producer.
F: Jon Jacobs, engineer; Dado Parisini, producer.
G: Ben Wisch, engineer/mixer.
H: Cesar Sogbe, Coti Sorokin, Demian Nava, Juan Blas Caballero, Matías Sorokin and Sebastián Schon, engineers/mixers; Cachorro López, producer.
I: Carlos Alvarez, Lulo Perez, Pepo Sherman, Rafa Sardina and Thom Russo, engineers; Lulo Pérez, producer.
J: Gustavo Santaolalla, producer.
K: Armando Avila, Juan Carlos Moguel and Pepe Ortega, engineers/mixers; Armando Avila, producer.
L: Bob Clearmountain, engineer/mixer; Tomás Torres, producer.
M: Gustavo Borner, engineer/mixer; Juan Luis Guerra, producer.
N: Seth Horan Atkins, Benny Faccone and Sadaharu Yagi, engineers/mixers.
O: Chris Sulit, engineer/mixer; Carlos Franzetti, producer.
P: Julio Reyes Copello, producer; Reyes, Javier Garza, Ricardo López Laliinde, and Carlos Fernando Lopez, engineers.
Q: Eduardo de la Paz Canel, engineer/mixer.
R: Carlos Hernández Carbonell and Dave Clauss, engineers/mixers.
S: Cheche Alara and Antonio "Moogie" Canazio, producers; Canazio, engineer/mixer.

See also

Grammy Award for Best Latin Pop, Rock or Urban Album
Grammy Award for Best Latin Recording
Lo Nuestro Award for Pop Album of the Year

References

External links 
Official Site of the Grammy Awards

 
Awards established in 1984
Latin Pop Album
Pop Album
Latin pop album
Album awards